A personal organizer, datebook, date log, daybook, day planner, personal analog assistant, book planner, year planner, or agenda (from Latin agenda – things to do), is a small book or binder that is designed to be portable. It usually contains a diary, calendar, address book, blank paper, and other sections.
The organizer is a personal tool and may also include pages with useful information, such as maps and telephone codes. It is related to the separate desktop stationery items that have one or more of the same functions, such as appointment calendars, rolodexes, notebooks, and almanacs.

They were sometimes referred to as a filofax, after the UK-based company Filofax that produces a popular range of personal organiser wallets.

By the end of the 20th century, paper-and-binder personal organizers started to be replaced by electronic devices such as personal digital assistants (PDAs), personal information manager software, and online organizers. This process has accelerated in the beginning of the 21st century with the advent of smartphones, tablet computers, smartwatches and a variety of mobile apps which enhance the potential for personal organisation and productivity

See also
 Bullet journalJournal often used as a handmade personal organizer
 Calendaring software or digital calendar – Electronic version of a calendar
 Circa NotebookBinding often used for personal organizers

References

 Personal organizer
Notebooks
Stationery
Written communication
Consumer electronics